Dintal-e Habibabad (also Romanized as Dīntal-e Ḩabībābād; also known as Dīntal) is a village in Sarrud-e Shomali Rural District, in the Central District of Boyer-Ahmad County, Kohgiluyeh and Boyer-Ahmad Province, Iran. At the 2006 census, its population was 208, in 51 families.

References 

Populated places in Boyer-Ahmad County